The Barreirinha Formation is a late Frasnian geologic formation of the Amazon Basin in the state of Amazonas of northern Brazil. The group comprises deep marine black shales and sandstones.

Fossil content 
The formation has provided conodont fossils of:

 Mehlina gradata
 Ozarkodina aff. sannemanni
 Cryptotaxis sp.
 Polygnathus sp.
 ?Prioniodina sp.

References

Bibliography 
 

Geologic formations of Brazil
Devonian System of South America
Devonian Brazil
Frasnian Stage
Shale formations
Sandstone formations
Deep marine deposits
Devonian south paleopolar deposits
Paleontology in Brazil
Formations